Gohen C. Arnold was the Republican President of the West Virginia Senate from Upshur County and served from 1921 to 1922.

References 

Presidents of the West Virginia State Senate
West Virginia state senators
Year of death missing
Year of birth missing